Take a Bow may refer to:

 Bowing, a social gesture
 "Take a Bow" (Leona Lewis song)
 "Take a Bow" (Madonna song)
 "Take a Bow" (Rihanna song)
 Take a Bow (TV series), a British children's television series
 Take a Bow, a 2010 album by Greg Laswell
 "Take a Bow", a song by The Agonist from Once Only Imagined
 "Take a Bow", a song by Muse from Black Holes and Revelations
 "Take a Bow", a song by Sister Hazel from Release